Shallow Bay is a natural bay near Pistolet Bay, Great Northern Peninsula, off the island of Newfoundland in the province of Newfoundland and Labrador, Canada.

References

Bays of Newfoundland and Labrador